Atresplayer Premium (often stylized as ATRESplayer Premium) is a Spanish paid subscription video on-demand over-the-top streaming service of Atresmedia.

History and description 
It was launched in Spain on 8 September 2019. The first original series released on the platform was El nudo. Besides the regular services offered by the ad-supported  (catch-up service and some series), Atresplayer Premium offers three main types of programming: Premium Exclusivo (full releases before free-to-air broadcasting), Premium Preestreno (series releasing a week before free-to-air broadcasting), and exclusive programming. As of 30 June 2020, it had 253,000 subscribers.

Unlike its rival Mitele Plus (initially betting on football/sport as main business line while leasing exclusive content rights in Spain to Amazon Prime Video), Atresplayer Premium restricted its offer to streaming original programming. It is available outside of Spain in Latin America, United States, Canada and Mexico under the "Paquete Premium Internacional" subscription mode. There is however geoblocked content.

Since Atresplayer Premium's launch, much of the Atresmedia original programming has been first released on the platform, including series such as La valla, Veneno, #Luimelia, Toy Boy or Perdida.

References 

Subscription video on demand services
Atresmedia
2019 establishments in Spain
2019 in Spanish television